The Return of Peter Grimm is a 1926 American silent fantasy film directed by Victor Schertzinger based on the 1911 play by David Belasco. It was produced and distributed by the Fox Film Corporation.

A print survives at the Museum of Modern Art (MOMA) in New York.

A previous short film of this play appeared in 1913. A sound feature was made in 1935, also titled The Return of Peter Grimm.

Plot
The ghost of a recently deceased family patriarch tries to help his surviving relatives, in part by preventing a marriage that he knows will go wrong.

Cast
Alec B. Francis as Peter Grimm
John Roche as Frederick Grimm
Janet Gaynor as Catherine
Richard Walling as James Hartman
Lionel Belmore as Reverend Bartholomey
Elizabeth Patterson as Mrs. Bartholomey
John St. Polis as Andrew MacPherson (uncredited) (St. Polis played Frederick in the 1911 Broadway play)
Bodil Rosing as Marta (uncredited)
Mickey McBan as William (uncredited)
Florence Gilbert as Annamarie (uncredited)
Sammy Cohen as The Clown (uncredited)

References

External links

Jacket cover featuring a scene from the film from a novelization of the story
Stills of Alec B. Francis and John Roche and Richard Walling at gettyimages.com

1926 films
1920s fantasy films
American black-and-white films
American fantasy films
American films based on plays
American silent feature films
Films about the afterlife
Films directed by Victor Schertzinger
Fox Film films
1920s American films
Silent horror films